Gerard "Ger" Mahon (born 1986) is an Irish hurler who played as a left wing-back for the Galway senior team.

Mahon joined the team during the 2005 championship and was a regular member of the team for six seasons. An All-Ireland medalist in the minor and under-21 grades, he enjoyed little success at senior level.

At club level Mahon plays with the Kinvara club.

References

1986 births
Living people
Kinvara hurlers
Galway inter-county hurlers